Disasters can have high costs associated with responding to and recovering from them. This page lists the estimated economic costs of relatively recent disasters.

The costs of disasters vary considerably depending on a range of factors, such as the geographical location where they occur. When a large disaster occurs in a wealthy country, the financial damage may be large, but when a comparable disaster occurs in a poorer country, the actual financial damage may appear to be relatively small.  This is in part due to the difficulty of measuring the financial damage in areas that lack insurance. For example, the 2004 Indian Ocean earthquake and tsunami, with a death toll of around 230,000 people, cost a 'mere' $15 billion, whereas in the Deepwater Horizon oil spill, in which 11 people died, the damages were six-fold.

The most expensive disaster in human history is the Chernobyl disaster, costing an estimated $700 billion. Chernobyl's circumstances make it a unique but particularly devastating situation that is unlikely to ever happen again. Estimations have only increased over time, with the recent figure coming from the release of new government data up to 2016. Furthermore, the cost is expected to perpetually increase for several thousand years as cleanup operations and the economic impact of the Chernobyl Exclusion Zone continue indefinitely. The most expensive natural disaster is the 2011 Tōhoku earthquake and tsunami, costing an estimated $360 billion.

Over $1 billion
This table lists disasters which are estimated to have an economic cost of at least 1 billion United States dollars without taking inflation into account.

Under $1 billion
This table lists notable disasters which are estimated to have an economic cost of less than 1 billion United States dollars without taking inflation into account. This includes historical disasters, such as the Great Chicago Fire, which would surpass the value of $1 billion in modern currency.

Note: All damage figures are listed in millions of United States dollars.

References 

Cost
History of insurance